Ur (Sumerian: , , or  Urim;  Uru;) was an important Sumerian city-state in ancient Mesopotamia, located at the site of modern Tell el-Muqayyar in south Iraq's Dhi Qar Governorate in the Arabian Peninsula. Although Ur was once a coastal city near the mouth of the Euphrates on the Persian Gulf, the coastline has shifted and the city is now well inland, on the south bank of the Euphrates,  from Nasiriyah in modern-day Iraq. The city dates from the Ubaid period circa 3800 BC, and is recorded in written history as a city-state from the 26th century BC, its first recorded king being Mesannepada.

The city's patron deity was Nanna (in Akkadian, Sin), the Sumerian and Akkadian moon god, and the name of the city is in origin derived from the god's name, UNUGKI, literally "the abode (UNUG) of Nanna". The site is marked by the partially restored ruins of the Ziggurat of Ur, which contained the shrine of Nanna, excavated in the 1930s. The temple was built in the 21st century BC (short chronology), during the reign of Ur-Nammu and was reconstructed in the 6th century BC by Nabonidus, the last king of Babylon.

Layout 

The city, said to have been planned by Ur-Nammu, was apparently divided into neighbourhoods, with merchants living in one quarter, artisans in another. There were streets both wide and narrow, and open spaces for gatherings. Many structures for water resource management and flood control are in evidence. Houses were constructed from mudbricks and mud plaster. In major buildings, the masonry was strengthened with bitumen and reeds. For the most part, foundations are all that remain today. People were often buried (separately and alone; sometimes with jewellery, pots, and weapons) in chambers or shafts beneath the house floors.

Elsewhere, buildings were integrated into the ramparts. The Euphrates River complemented these fortifications on the city's western side.

Society and culture 
Archaeological discoveries have shown unequivocally that Ur was a major Sumerian urban center on the Mesopotamian plain. Especially the discovery of the Royal Tombs has confirmed its splendour. These tombs, which date to the Early Dynastic IIIa period (approximately in the 25th or 24th century BC), contained an immense treasure of luxury items made of precious metals and semi-precious stones imported from long distances (Ancient Iran, Afghanistan, India, Asia Minor, the Levant and the Persian Gulf). This wealth, unparalleled up to then, is a testimony of Ur's economic importance during the Early Bronze Age.

Archaeological study of the region has contributed greatly to our understanding of the landscape and long-distance interactions during these ancient times. Ur was a major port on the Persian Gulf, which extended much farther inland than today, and the city controlled much of the trade into Mesopotamia. Imports to Ur came from many parts of the world: precious metals such as gold and silver, and semi-precious stones, namely lapis lazuli and carnelian.

It is thought that Ur had a stratified social system including slaves (captured foreigners), farmers, artisans, doctors, scribes, and priests. High-ranking priests apparently enjoyed great luxury and splendid mansions. Tens of thousands of cuneiform texts have been recovered from temples, the palace, and individual houses, recording contracts, inventories, and court documents, evidence of the city's complex economic and legal systems.

Excavation in the old city of Ur in 1929 revealed the Lyres of Ur, instruments similar to the modern harp but in the shape of a bull and with eleven strings.

History

Prehistory 
When Ur was founded, the Persian Gulf's water level was two-and-a-half metres higher than today. Ur is therefore thought to have had marshy surroundings; irrigation would have been unnecessary, and the city's evident canal system was likely used for transportation. Fish, birds, tubers, and reeds might have supported Ur economically without the need for an agricultural revolution sometimes hypothesized as a prerequisite to urbanization.

Archaeologists have discovered the evidence of an early occupation at Ur during the Ubaid period (c. 6500 to 3800 BC). These early levels were sealed off with a sterile deposit of soil that was interpreted by excavators of the 1920s as evidence for the Great Flood of the Book of Genesis and Epic of Gilgamesh. It is now understood that the South Mesopotamian plain was exposed to regular floods from the Euphrates and the Tigris rivers, with heavy erosion from water and wind, which may have given rise to the Mesopotamian and derivative Biblical Great Flood stories.

Sumerian occupation of the 4th millennium BC
The further occupation of Ur becomes clear only during its emergence in the third millennium BC (although it must already have been a growing urban center during the fourth millennium). As other Sumerians, the new settlers of Ur were a non-Semitic people who may have come from the east circa 3300 BC, and spoke a language isolate. The third millennium BC is generally described as the Early Bronze Age of Mesopotamia, which ends approximately after the demise of the Third Dynasty of Ur in the 21st century BC.

Bronze Age

There are various main sources informing scholars about the importance of Ur during the Early Bronze Age. The First Dynasty of Ur seems to have had great wealth and power, as shown by the lavish remains of the Royal Cemetery at Ur. The Sumerian King List provides a tentative political history of ancient Sumer and mentions, among others, several rulers of Ur. Mesannepada is the first king mentioned in the Sumerian King List, and appears to have lived in the 26th century BC. That Ur was an important urban centre already then seems to be indicated by a type of cylinder seal called the City Seals. These seals contain a set of Proto-Cuneiform signs which appear to be writings or symbols of the name of city-states in ancient Mesopotamia. Many of these seals have been found in Ur, and the name of Ur is prominent on them. Ur came under the control of the Semitic-speaking Akkadian Empire founded by Sargon the Great between the 24th and 22nd centuries BC. This was a period when the Semitic-speaking Akkadians, who had entered Mesopotamia in approximately 3000 BC, gained ascendancy over the Sumerians, and indeed much of the ancient Near East.

Ur III 

After a short period of chaos following the fall of the Akkadian Empire the third Ur dynasty was established when the king Ur-Nammu came to power, ruling between c. 2047 BC and 2030 BC. During his rule, temples, including the Ziggurat of Ur, were built, and agriculture was improved through irrigation. His code of laws, the Code of Ur-Nammu (a fragment was identified in Istanbul in 1952) is one of the oldest such documents known, preceding the Code of Hammurabi by 300 years. He and his successor Shulgi were both deified during their reigns, and after his death he continued as a hero-figure: one of the surviving works of Sumerian literature describes the death of Ur-Nammu and his journey to the underworld.

Ur-Nammu was succeeded by Shulgi, the greatest king of the Third Dynasty of Ur, who solidified the hegemony of Ur and reformed the empire into a highly centralized bureaucratic state. Shulgi ruled for a long time (at least 42 years) and deified himself halfway through his rule.

The Ur empire continued through the reigns of three more kings with Semitic Akkadian names, Amar-Sin, Shu-Sin, and Ibbi-Sin. It fell around 1940 BC to the Elamites in the 24th regnal year of Ibbi-Sin, an event commemorated by the Lament for Ur.

According to one estimate, Ur was the largest city in the world from c. 2030 to 1980 BC. Its population was approximately 65,000 (or 0.1 per cent share of global population then).

The city of Ur lost its political power after the demise of the Third Dynasty of Ur. Nevertheless, its important position which kept on providing access to the Persian Gulf ensured the ongoing economic importance of the city during the second millennium BC. The city came to be ruled by the first dynasty (Amorite) of Babylon which rose to prominence in southern Mesopotamia in the 19th century BC. After the fall of Hammurabi's short lived Babylonian Empire, it later became a part of the Sealand Dynasty for several centuries. It then came under the control of the Kassites in the 16th century BC.

Iron Age
The city, along with the rest of southern Mesopotamia and much of the Near East, Asia Minor, North Africa and southern Caucasus, fell to the north Mesopotamian Neo-Assyrian Empire from the 10th to late 7th centuries BC. From the end of the 7th century BC Ur was ruled by the so-called Chaldean Dynasty of Babylon. In the 6th century BC there was new construction in Ur under the rule of Nebuchadnezzar II of Babylon. The last Babylonian king, Nabonidus (who was Assyrian-born and not a Chaldean), improved the ziggurat. However, the city started to decline from around 530 BC after Babylonia fell to the Persian Achaemenid Empire, and was no longer inhabited by the early 5th century BC. The demise of Ur was perhaps owing to drought, changing river patterns, and the silting of the outlet to the Persian Gulf.

Identification with the Biblical Ur 

Ur is possibly the city of Ur Kasdim mentioned in the Book of Genesis as the birthplace of the Hebrew and Muslim patriarch Abraham (Ibrahim in Arabic), traditionally believed to have lived some time in the 2nd millennium BC. There are however conflicting traditions and scholarly opinions identifying Ur Kasdim with the sites of Şanlıurfa, Urkesh, Urartu or Kutha.

The biblical Ur is mentioned four times in the Torah or Hebrew Bible, with the distinction "of the Kasdim/Kasdin"—traditionally rendered in English as "Ur of the Chaldees". The Chaldeans had settled in the vicinity by around 850 BC, but were not extant anywhere in Mesopotamia during the 2nd millennium BC period when Abraham is traditionally held to have lived. The Chaldean dynasty did not rule Babylonia (and thus become the rulers of Ur) until the late 7th century BC, and held power only until the mid 6th century BC. The name is found in Genesis 11:28, Genesis 11:31, and Genesis 15:7. In Nehemiah 9:7, a single passage mentioning Ur is a paraphrase of Genesis. 

In March 2021, Pope Francis visited Ur during his journey through Iraq.

Archaeology 

In 1625, the site was visited by Pietro Della Valle, who recorded the presence of ancient bricks stamped with strange symbols, cemented together with bitumen, as well as inscribed pieces of black marble that appeared to be seals. European archaeologists did not identify Tell el-Muqayyar as the site of Ur until Henry Rawlinson successfully deciphered some bricks from that location, brought to England by William Loftus in 1849.

The site was first excavated in 1853 and 1854, on behalf of the British Museum and with instructions from the Foreign Office, by John George Taylor, British vice consul at Basra from 1851 to 1859. Taylor uncovered the Ziggurat of Ur and a structure with an arch later identified as part of the "Gate of Judgment".

In the four corners of the ziggurat's top stage, Taylor found clay cylinders bearing an inscription of Nabonidus (Nabuna`id), the last king of Babylon (539 BC), closing with a prayer for his son Belshar-uzur (Bel-ŝarra-Uzur), the Belshazzar of the Book of Daniel. Evidence was found of prior restorations of the ziggurat by Ishme-Dagan of Isin and Shu-Sin of Ur, and by Kurigalzu, a Kassite king of Babylon in the 14th century BC. Nebuchadnezzar also claims to have rebuilt the temple.

Taylor further excavated an interesting Babylonian building, not far from the temple, part of an ancient Babylonian necropolis. All about the city he found abundant remains of burials of later periods. Apparently, in later times, owing to its sanctity, Ur became a favorite place of sepulchres, so that even after it had ceased to be inhabited, it continued to be used as a necropolis. Typical of the era, his excavations destroyed information and exposed the tell. Natives used the now loosened, 4,000-year-old bricks and tile for construction for the next 75 years, while the site lay unexplored, the British Museum having decided to prioritize archaeology in Assyria.

After Taylor's time, the site was visited by numerous travellers, almost all of whom have found ancient Babylonian remains, inscribed stones and the like, lying upon the surface. The site was considered rich in remains, and relatively easy to explore. After some soundings were made in 1918 by Reginald Campbell Thompson, H. R. Hall worked the site for one season for the British Museum in 1919, laying the groundwork for more extensive efforts to follow.

Excavations from 1922 to 1934 were funded by the British Museum and the University of Pennsylvania and led by the archaeologist Sir Charles Leonard Woolley. A total of about 1,850 burials were uncovered, including 16 that were described as "royal tombs" containing many valuable artifacts, including the Standard of Ur. Most of the royal tombs were dated to about 2600 BC. The finds included the unlooted tomb of a queen thought to be Queen Puabi—the name is known from a cylinder seal found in the tomb, although there were two other different and unnamed seals found in the tomb. Many other people had been buried with her, in a form of human sacrifice. Near the ziggurat were uncovered the temple E-nun-mah and buildings E-dub-lal-mah (built for a king), E-gi-par (residence of the high priestess) and E-hur-sag (a temple building). 

Outside the temple area, many houses used in everyday life were found. Excavations were also made below the royal tombs layer: a  layer of alluvial clay covered the remains of earlier habitation, including pottery from the Ubaid period, the first stage of settlement in southern Mesopotamia. Woolley later wrote many articles and books about the discoveries. One of Woolley's assistants on the site was the British archaeologist Max Mallowan. 

The discoveries at the site reached the headlines in mainstream media in the world with the discoveries of the Royal Tombs. As a result, the ruins of the ancient city attracted many visitors. One of these visitors was the already famous Agatha Christie, who as a result of this visit ended up marrying Max Mallowan. During this time the site was accessible from the Baghdad–Basra railway, from a stop called "Ur Junction".

In 2009, an agreement was reached for a joint University of Pennsylvania and Iraqi team to resume archaeological work at the site of Ur. Excavations began in 2015 under the direction of Elizabeth C Stone and Paul Zimansky of the State University of New York. The first excavation season was primarily to re-excavate Woolley's work in an Old Babylonian housing area with two new trenches for confirmation. Among other finds a cylinder seal, a cuneiform tablet, and balance pan weights were found. A similar though smaller dig was made in a Neo-Babylonian housing area.

The Royal Tomb Excavation
When the Royal Tombs at Ur were discovered, their size was unknown. Excavators started digging two trenches in the middle of the desert to see if they could find anything that would allow them to keep digging. They split into two teams - A and team B. Both teams spent the first few months digging a trench and found evidence of burial grounds by collecting small pieces of golden jewelry and pottery. This was called the "gold trench". After the first season of digging finished, Woolley returned to England. In Autumn, Woolley returned and started the second season. By the end of the second season, he had uncovered a courtyard surrounded by many rooms. In their third season of digging archaeologists had uncovered their biggest find yet, a building that was believed to have been constructed by order of the king, and a second building thought to be where the high priestess lived. As the fourth and fifth season came to a close, they had discovered so many items that most of their time was now spent recording the objects they found instead of actually digging objects. Items included gold jewelry, clay pots and stones. One of the most significant objects was the Standard of Ur. By the end of their sixth season they had excavated 1850 burial sites and deemed 17 of them to be "Royal Tombs". Some clay sealings and cuneiform tablet fragment were found in an underlying layer.

Woolley finished his work excavating the Royal Tombs in 1934, uncovering a series of burials. Many servants were killed and buried with the royals, who he believed went to their deaths willingly. Computerized tomography scans on some of the surviving skulls have showed signs that they were killed by blows to the head that could be from the spiked end of a copper axe, which showed Woolley's initial theory of mass suicide via poison to be incorrect.

Inside Puabi's tomb there was a chest in the middle of the room. Underneath that chest was a hole in the ground that led to what was called the "King's Grave": PG-789. It was believed to be the king's grave because it was buried next to the queen. In this grave, there were 63 attendants who were all equipped with copper helmets and swords. It is thought to be his army buried with him. Another large room was uncovered, PG-1237, called the "Great death pit". This large room had 74 bodies, 68 of which were women. There were only two artifacts in the tomb, both of which were Lyres.

Most of the treasures excavated at Ur are in the British Museum, the University of Pennsylvania Museum of Archaeology and Anthropology and the Baghdad Museum. At the Penn Museum the exhibition "Iraq's Ancient Past", which includes many of the most famous pieces from the Royal Tombs, opened to visitors in late Spring 2011. Previously, the Penn Museum had sent many of its best pieces from Ur on tour in an exhibition called "Treasures From the Royal Tombs of Ur." It traveled to eight American museums, including those in Cleveland, Washington and Dallas, ending the tour at the Detroit Institute of Art in May 2011.

Samples from two stratigraphic layers in the royal cemetery area, from before the royal burials, have been radiocarbon dated. The ED Ia layer dated to c. 2900 BC and the ED Ic layer to c. 2679 BC.

Archaeological remains 

Though some of the areas that were cleared during modern excavations have sanded over again, the Great Ziggurat is fully cleared and stands as the best-preserved and most visible landmark at the site. Parts of the tomb area appear to be in need of structural consolidation or stabilization.

There are cuneiform (Sumerian writing) on many walls, some entirely covered in script stamped into the mud-bricks. The text is sometimes difficult to read, but it covers most surfaces. Modern graffiti has also found its way to the graves, usually in the form of names made with coloured pens (sometimes they are carved). The Great Ziggurat itself has far more graffiti, mostly lightly carved into the bricks. The graves are completely empty. A small number of the tombs are accessible. Most of them have been cordoned off. The whole site is covered with pottery debris, to the extent that it is virtually impossible to set foot anywhere without stepping on some. Some have colours and paintings on them. Some of the "mountains" of broken pottery are debris that has been removed from excavations. Pottery debris and human remains form many of the walls of the royal tombs area. In May 2009, the United States Army returned the Ur site to the Iraqi authorities, who hope to develop it as a tourist destination.

Preservation 

Since 2009, the non-profit organization Global Heritage Fund (GHF) has been working to protect and preserve Ur against the problems of erosion, neglect, inappropriate restoration, war and conflict. GHF's stated goal for the project is to create an informed and scientifically grounded Master Plan to guide the long-term conservation and management of the site, and to serve as a model for the stewardship of other sites.

Since 2013, the institution for Development Cooperation of the Italian Ministry of Foreign Affairs DGCS and the SBAH, the State Board of Antiquities and Heritage of the Iraqi Ministry of Tourism and Antiquities, have started a cooperation project for "The Conservation and Maintenance of Archaeological site of UR". In the framework of this cooperation agreement, the executive plan, with detailed drawings, is in progress for the maintenance of the Dublamah Temple (design concluded, works starting), the Royal Tombs—Mausolea 3rd Dynasty (in progress)—and the Ziqqurat (in progress). The first updated survey in 2013 has produced a new aerial map derived by the flight of a UAV (unmanned aerial vehicle) operated in March 2014. This is the first high-resolution map, derived from more than 100 aerial photograms, with an accuracy of 20 cm or less. A preview of the ORTHO-PHOTOMAP of Archaeological Site of UR is available online.

Tal Abu Tbeirah 
Since 2012, a joint team of Italian and Iraqi archaeologists led by Franco D'Agostino have been excavating at Tal Abu Tbeirah, located 15 kilometers east of Ur and 7 kilometers south of Nasariyah (30° 98′
43.93′′ E, 46° 26′ 97.35′′ N).
The site, about 45 hectares in area divided into four sectors by an ancient channel, appears to have been a harbor and trading center associated with Ur in the later half of the 3rd Millennium BC. The site was a medium sized city in the Early Dynastic period but shrank down to a small area in the northeast sector in the Ur III and Old Babylonian periods. Among the finds was a large perforated potter's wheel and two bricks inscribed with the name of Ur III king Amar-Sin.

See also 
 Correspondence of the Kings of Ur
 History of Iraq
 History of Sumer
 The lake and city of Urmia in Iran
 List of cities of the ancient Near East
 Lyres of Ur
 Ram in a Thicket
 Royal Game of Ur
 Short chronology

References 
Notes:

Bibliography:
Black, J. and Spada, G., "Texts from Ur: Kept in the Iraq Museum and the British Museum.", Nisaba 19, Messina: Dipartimento di Scienze dell’Antichitá 2008 
Crawford, Harriet. Ur: The City of the Moon God. London: Bloomsbury, 2015. 
D’Agostino, F., Pomponio, F., and Laurito, R., "Neo-Sumerian Texts from Ur in the British Museum.", Nisaba 5, Messina: Dipartimento di Scienze dell’Antichitá, 2004
C. J. Gadd. History and monuments of Ur, Chatto & Windus, 1929.
P. R. S. Morrey. "Where Did They Bury the Kings of the IIIrd Dynasty of Ur?", Iraq, vol. 46, no. 1, pp. 1–18, 1984.
P.R.S. Morrey. ”What Do We Know About the People Buried in the Royal Cemetery?”, Expedition Magazine, Penn Museum, vol. 20, iss. 1, pp. 24–40, 1977
J. Oates, "Ur and Eridu: The Prehistory", Iraq, vol. 22, pp. 32–50, 1960.
Pardo Mata, Pilar, "Ur, ciudad de los sumerios". Cuenca: Alderaban, 2006. .
Susan Pollock, “Chronology of the Royal Cemetery of Ur”,  Iraq, vol. 47, pp. 129–158, British Institute for the Study of Iraq, 1985
Susan Pollock, “Of Priestesses, Princes and Poor Relations: The Dead in the Royal Cemetery of Ur”, Cambridge Archaeological Journal, vol. 1, iss. 2, 1991
Licia Romano and Franco D'Agostino, "Abu Tbeirah Excavations I. Area 1: Last Phase and Building A – Phase 1", Sapienza Università Editrice, Jun 7, 2019, 
   Leon Legrain, "Ur Excavations III: Archaic seal-impressions", Publications of the Joint Expedition of the British Museum and of the University Museum, University of Pennsylvania, Philadelphia, to Mesopotamia : Ur excavations, Oxford University Press, 1936
 Wencel, M. M., "New radiocarbon dates from southern Mesopotamia (Fara and Ur)", Iraq, 80, pp. 251-261, 2018
 Woolley, Leonard, "Ur Excavations II. The Royal Cemetery", Plates,  Publications of the Joint Expedition of the British Museum and of the University Museum, University of Pennsylvania, Philadelphia, to Mesopotamia : Ur excavations, Oxford University Press, 1927
 Ur excavations IV: The Early Periods, Oxford University Press, 1927.
 Ur Excavations V: The Ziggurat and Its Surroundings, Oxford University Press, 1927.
 with M.E.L. Mallowan (ed. T. C. Mitchell): Ur Excavations VII: The Old Babylonian Period, Oxford University Press, 1927
 (ed. T. C. Mitchell), Ur Excavations VIII: The Kassite Period, Oxford University Press, 1927
 with M.E.L. Mallowan (ed. T. C. Mitchell),: Ur Excavations IX: The Neo-Babylonian and Persian Periods, Oxford University Press, 1927
 Ur of the Chaldees: A record of seven years of excavation. Ernest Benn Limited, 1920.

External links 

City of the Moon New Excavations at Ur - Penn Museum - 2017
An exploration of the Royal Tombs of Ur, with a comprehensive selection of high-resolution photographs detailing the treasures found in the tombs
Explore some of the Royal Tombs, Mesopotamia website from the British Museum
Treasures from the Royal Tombs of Ur
British Museum and Penn Museum Ur site – has field reports
Jewish Encyclopedia: Ur
Woolley’s Ur Revisited, Richard L. Zettler, BAR 10:05, September/October 1984.
Ur Excavations of the University of Pennsylvania Museum
At Ur, Ritual Deaths That Were Anything but Serene on The New York Times
Web site for new Iraqi/Italian dig

 
Sumerian cities
Archaeological sites in Iraq
Dhi Qar Governorate
Former populated places in Iraq
Levant
4th-millennium BC establishments
Populated places established in the 4th millennium BC
Ubaid period
City-states